Asterix Versus Caesar (also known in France as Astérix et la surprise de César) is a 1985 French–Belgian animated adventure comedy film written by René Goscinny, Albert Uderzo and Pierre Tchernia, and directed by Paul and Gaëtan Brizzi, and is the fourth film adaptation of the Asterix comic book series. The story, which combines the plots of Asterix the Gladiator and Asterix the Legionary, sees Asterix and his friend Obelix set off to rescue two lovers from their village that had been kidnapped by the Romans. The film's theme song, Astérix est là, was composed and performed by Plastic Bertrand.

A book was released containing the story and stills from the film. It was later reprinted when Orion Publishing re-released the entire series.

Plot
To honour Julius Caesar's successful campaigns of conquest, gifts are brought to Rome from across the Roman Empire. Seeking to cement the celebrations, Caesar orders Caius Fatuous, head of a prominent gladiator school, to provide him with a grand show. Meanwhile in Gaul, Asterix notices that his friend Obelix  has begun acting strangely. Getafix soon reveals that he is in love with Panacea, Chief Vitalstatistix's niece, who had recently returned. Attempting to win her affections, Obelix becomes distraught when she is reunited with Tragicomix, a much younger and handsome man who intends to marry her. Seeking to spend time together, the two lovers venture out into nearby woods, only to be ambushed by a group of Romans, led by a fresh recruit hoping to make a good impression.

When Asterix and Obelix discover what happened, they inform the village, who proceed to attack the garrison. In the aftermath, the camp's Centurion is questioned. He reveals that he angrily ordered the recruit to take his prisoners away, knowing of the consequences that the recruit's actions would bring. Asterix and Obelix, joined by Dogmatix, proceed to the nearest Legion HQ for information on where the recruit went. Upon learning he was dispatched to a distant outpost in the Sahara Desert with his prisoners, they join the army in order to follow after them. Arriving at the desert frontier, the pair learn that Panacea and Tragicomix escaped from the Romans before their arrival, and after deserting the Romans, soon discover that a band of slave traders found them and sold them on to Rome.

Securing passage to the Roman capital, Asterix and Obelix learn that Panacea and Tragicomix were bought by Caius. The pair attempt to meet with him at a bathhouse, causing Caius to witness them beating up his bodyguards easily. Impressed, he orders his men to capture them for his show. Following a small argument with his friend that causes him to misplace his magic potion, Asterix is kidnapped by Caius' men. When Obelix discovers he is missing, he proceeds to seek him out, rescuing him from a flooded cell. However Dogmatix goes missing, after running off into the city's sewers to recover the magic potion. Without both, the pair continue to seek out Panacea and Tragicomix and quickly learn that, under Caesar's orders, Caius arranged for them to become the grand finale of the emperor's show at the Colosseum.

Seeking to gain entry, the pair go to Caius' school and secure places as gladiators the following day. The Gauls soon quickly make a mess of the show, winning a chariot race and easily beating down a number of gladiators. As lions are released to kill them, alongside Tragicomix and Panacea, Dogmatix arrives with the magic potion. The group defeat the lions with the potion, while Obelix, distracted by Panacea, accidentally shatters a third of the Colosseum. Impressed with the show, Caesar grants the Gauls their freedom and gets Caius fed to the lions in their place. Returning home, the group arrive to their village's trademark victory feast being held in their honour. As the villagers celebrate, Asterix sits alone in a tree, after having somewhat fallen for Panacea on his return.

Voice Cast

Additional Voices
 Original: José Luccioni, Paul Mercey, Edmond Bernard, Paul Bisciglia, Gérard Croce, Alain Doutey, Peter Wollasch, Roger Barbet, Alain Coutey, Martin Lamotte
 English: Bill Dunn, Stuart Seide, Mike Marshall, Thomas M. Pollard, Bill Doherty, Christian Erickson, Paul Barrett, Norman Stockle, Derry Hall, Peter Semmler, Robert Ground, Raphael Rodriguez, Mostefa Stiti, Herbert Baskind, Ken Starcevic

Home media

In 1990, the film was released on VHS by Celebrity Home Entertainment. In 2006, the film was released on Region 2 DVD as a part of a box set of animated Asterix films.

Television 
In the United Kingdom, it was watched by 320,000 viewers on television during the first half of 2005, making it the ninth most-watched foreign-language film on UK television during that period.

References

External links
 AsterixNZ entry
 

1985 films
1985 animated films
1980s French animated films
1980s French-language films
French animated films
Asterix films
Films set in ancient Egypt
Films set in Rome
Animated films based on comics
French children's films
Films about Julius Caesar
Films based on multiple works of a series
Films directed by Paul and Gaëtan Brizzi
Films scored by Vladimir Cosma
1980s children's animated films
Films with screenplays by Pierre Tchernia